The following radio stations broadcast on FM frequency 88.3 MHz:

Argentina
 FM SOL 88,3 Mhz - Ciudad Autónoma de Buenos Aires 
 88.3 in La Plata, Buenos Aires 
 Ciudad de Totoras in Totoras, Santa Fe 
 Horizonte (radio station) in El Volcán, San Luis
 La Tecno in Villa Dominico, Buenos Aires 
 LRS307 Génesis in Felicia, Santa Fe
 Pop Bahia in Bahia Blanca, Buenos Aires 
 R80 in Buenos Aires 
 Radio Ciudad in Goya, Corrientes
 Radio Cristiana in Munro, Buenos Aires 
 Radio María in Ushuaia, Tierra del Fuego
 Radio Sur in Buenos Aires 
 Wox FM in Rosario, Santa Fe

Australia
 88.3 Southern FM in Melbourne, Victoria

Canada (Channel 202)
 CBF-FM-15 in L'Annonciation, Quebec
 CBFX-FM-3 in Amos, Quebec
 CBLJ-FM in Wawa, Ontario
 CBM-FM-3 in Iqaluit, Nunavut
 CBPI-FM-1 in Waterton Park, Alberta
 CBQT-FM in Thunder Bay, Ontario
 CBUO-FM in Fort Nelson, British Columbia
 CBYJ-FM in Fort St. John, British Columbia
 CFAK-FM in Sherbrooke, Quebec
 CIKX-FM-1 in Plaster Rock, New Brunswick
 CJIQ-FM in Paris, Ontario
 CJLU-FM-1 in Wolfville, Nova Scotia
 CKIA-FM in Quebec City, Quebec
 CKXU-FM in Lethbridge, Alberta
 VF2460 in Ymir, British Columbia

China 
 CNR China Traffic Radio in Guiyang
 CNR Music Radio in Lanzhou

Malaysia
 8FM in Seremban, Negeri Sembilan
 Radio Klasik in Ipoh, Perak

Mexico

 XHDCP-FM in Ario de Rosales, Michoacán
 XHGJO-FM in Guelatao de Juárez, Oaxaca
XHPCTN-FM in Compostela-Tepic, Nayarit
XHPCZA-FM in Chignahuapan-Zacatlán-Ahuazotepec, Puebla
XHSJI-FM in San José Iturbide, Guanajuato
XHPVAT-FM in Maravatío, Michoacán
 XHRPR-FM in Tuxtla Gutiérrez, Chiapas
 XHTEJ-FM in Tejupilco de Hidalgo, Estado de México

New Zealand
Various low-power stations up to 1 watt

Philippines
DWJM in Manila, Philippines
DWGO-FM in Legazpi City, Philippines
DYAP-FM in Cebu City, Philippines
DXWC in Zamboanga City, Philippines
DXDR in Davao City, Philippines

Russia
 Retro FM in Moscow
 Retro FM in Yuzhno-Sakhalinsk
 Avtoradio in Vladivostok
 DFM in Yekaterinburg

Singapore
 883Jia in Singapore

United Kingdom
 BBC Radio 2 in Angus, East Ayrshire, Isle of Lewis, Millburn Muir, Shetland, Snowdonia, South Newry, Trowbridge, Ullapool, W. Midlands, Wensleydale, Windermere 
 University Radio York in York

United States (Channel 202) 
  in Little Rock, Arkansas
 KAFR in Willis, Texas
 KAIX in Casper, Wyoming
  in Ruston, Louisiana
 KAWV in Alice, Texas
  in Greenacres, California
  in Blytheville, Arkansas
  in Bronson, Kansas           
 KBKO in Kodiak, Alaska
  in Bismarck, North Dakota
  in Brownsville, Texas
  in Brainerd, Minnesota
  in Portland, Oregon   
 KBWW in Broken Bow, Oklahoma
 KBYS in Lake Charles, Louisiana
  in Cedar Rapids, Iowa
 KCLU-FM in Thousand Oaks, California
 KCPC in Camino, California
 KCPW-FM in Salt Lake City, Utah
  in Coalinga, California
 KEQQ-LP in Grand Forks, North Dakota
 KESD (FM) in Brookings, South Dakota
 KEUR-LP in Eureka, Montana
 KFFR in Winter Park, Colorado
 KGSY in McCall, Idaho
 KGUA in Gualala, California
 KHNW in Manson, Washington
 KIEE in St. Martinville, Louisiana
 KIPH in Hana, Hawaii
 KITF in International Falls, Minnesota
  in Mexico, Missouri
 KJCG in Missoula, Montana
 KJGM in Bastrop, Louisiana
 KJGT in Waconia, Minnesota
 KJRN in Keene, Texas
 KJRT in Amarillo, Texas
 KJSB in Jonesboro, Arkansas
 KJTS in New Ulm, Minnesota
 KJTT in Story City, Iowa
 KKAG (FM) in Grangeville, Idaho
  in Newton, Iowa
 KLHK in Hobbs, New Mexico
  in Scottsbluff, Nebraska
  in Rapid City, South Dakota
  in Grand Island, Nebraska
  in Magalia, California
  in Livingston, California
  in Albuquerque, New Mexico
  in Jackson, Wyoming
  in Moses Lake, Washington
 KMSC (FM) in Sioux City, Iowa
  in Eureka, California
 KMUR in Bullhead City, Arizona
 KOEG in Walters, Oklahoma
 KOLB in Hartington, Nebraska
 KOSR (FM) in Stillwater, Oklahoma
 KPAC (FM) in San Antonio, Texas
 KPHF in Phoenix, Arizona
  in Montrose, Colorado
  in Craig, Colorado
  in Beatrice, Nebraska
 KQLF in Ottumwa, Iowa
 KQQM in Miles City, Montana
 KRAF in Fort Stockton, Texas
 KRHJ in Lamar, Colorado
 KRTG in Carthage, Texas
 KSBC in Nile, Washington
 KSDS in San Diego, California
  in Ashland, Oregon
 KTCN in Acton, California
 KTGS in Tishomingo, Oklahoma
 KTHN-LP in Texarkana, Texas
  in Pueblo, Colorado
  in Riverside, California
  in Concordia, Kansas
 KVCP in Phoenix, Arizona
 KVRK in Chickaloon, Alaska
 KVXO in Fort Collins, Colorado
 KWIS in Plummer, Idaho
  in Springfield, Missouri
  in Fayetteville, Arkansas
 KXJT in Rio Grande City, Texas
 KYEC in Doniphan, Missouri
 KYFW in Wichita, Kansas
 KYPW in Wolf Point, Montana
  in Sparks, Nevada
 KYZQ in Mount Pleasant, Texas
 KZLR in Fairbanks, Alaska
 WAER in Syracuse, New York
 WAFJ in Belvedere, South Carolina
  in Tupelo, Mississippi
  in Cincinnati, Ohio
 WANH in Meredith, New Hampshire
  in Selma, Alabama
 WARA-FM in New Washington, Indiana
  in Shelby, Ohio
  in Kankakee, Illinois
  in Dublin, Georgia
  in Marianna, Florida
  in Clarksville, Tennessee
  in Newark, New Jersey
  in Shelbyville, Tennessee
  in La Belle, Florida
  in Boxford, Massachusetts
 WBWC in Berea, Ohio
  in Ann Arbor, Michigan
 WCIN in Bath, New York
 WCOB in State College, Pennsylvania
  in Warsaw, New York
  in Kingsport, Tennessee
 WCXK in Kalamazoo, Michigan
  in Carlisle, Pennsylvania
  in Downers Grove, Illinois
 WDSO in Chesterton, Indiana
 WDTE in Grosse Point Shores, Michigan
 WEAX in Angola, Indiana
 WEBF in Lerose, Kentucky
  in White Star, Michigan
  in Nashua, New Hampshire
  in Rockford, Illinois
  in Olivebridge, New York
  in Franklin, Massachusetts
 WGBZ in Ocean City, Maryland
  in Pennsuco, Florida
  in Palatine, Illinois
 WHJR in Murphysboro, Illinois
  in Menomonie, Wisconsin
 WHWN in Painesville, Ohio
 WHZN in New Whiteland, Indiana
  in Concord, Massachusetts
  in Macomb, Illinois
 WJCK (FM) in Piedmont, Alabama
  in Ramsey, Illinois
 WJUV in Cullman, Alabama
 WKIW in Ironwood, Michigan
  in Muncie, Indiana
 WKPK in Michigamme, Michigan
  in Fort Wayne, Indiana
  in Findlay, Ohio
 WLIW-FM in Southampton, New York
  in Tafton, Pennsylvania
  in Jesup, Georgia
 WLSF in Starke, Florida
 WLVV (FM) in Midland, Maryland
 WLXK in Boiling Springs, North Carolina
 WLYG in Jasper, Georgia
  in Murrells Inlet, South Carolina
  in Marietta, Ohio
  in Murfreesboro, Tennessee
  in Port Huron, Michigan
  in Evansville, Indiana
  in Northfield, Vermont
  in South Vienna, Ohio
  in Edinburg, Virginia
  in Pontiac, Illinois
 WPLH in Tifton, Georgia
 WPOZ in Orlando, Florida
 WPPR in Demorest, Georgia
 WQHE in Oil City, Pennsylvania
 WQIQ in Spotsylvania, Virginia
  in Bristol, Rhode Island
 WRBH in New Orleans, Louisiana
 WRCC in Dibrell, Tennessee
 WRCT in Pittsburgh, Pennsylvania
 WRGC-FM in Milledgeville, Georgia
  in White Hall, Illinois
  in Rockland, Massachusetts
  in Mayaguez, Puerto Rico
 WRVL in Lynchburg, Virginia
 WSBU in Saint Bonaventure, New York
  in Glasgow, Kentucky
 WSGR in New Boston, Ohio
  in Southfield, Michigan
 WSMZ-FM in Crystal Valley, Michigan
 WTCY in Greilickville, Michigan
 WTIO in Mainesburg, Pennsylvania
 WTTT in Springfield, Illinois
  in Erwin, North Carolina
 WUTU in Sasser, Georgia
 WVBH (FM) in Beach Haven West, New Jersey
  in Loudonville, New York
 WVRL in Elizabeth City, North Carolina
 WWEC in Elizabethtown, Pennsylvania
 WXAV in Chicago, Illinois
  in Beaufort, North Carolina
 WXLS in Tupper Lake, New York
 WXOU in Auburn Hills, Michigan
  in Toledo, Ohio
  in Toledo, Ohio
  in Yarmouth, Maine
 WYBQ in Leesport, Pennsylvania
 WYBX in Key West, Florida
 WYLV in Maynardville, Tennessee
 WYZX in East Falmouth, Massachusetts
 WZRD in Chicago, Illinois
 WZXE in East Nottingham, Pennsylvania
  in Chambersburg, Pennsylvania

References

Lists of radio stations by frequency